Alfred Döring (born 7 February 1933) is a German former middle-distance runner. He competed in the men's 3000 metres steeplechase at the 1964 Summer Olympics.

References

External links
 

1933 births
Living people
Athletes (track and field) at the 1964 Summer Olympics
German male middle-distance runners
German male steeplechase runners
Olympic athletes of the United Team of Germany
Sportspeople from Lubusz Voivodeship
People from Sulęcin County
20th-century German people